Angelina Rachel de Lanerolle (23 December 1939 – 29 March 2019), popularly known as Angeline Gunathilake or Anjalin Gunathilaka, was a Sri Lankan singer, primarily working as a playback singer in Sinhala film industry. Considered the Silver bell of Sinhala cinema, Gunathilaka worked on over 5000 playback songs in a musical career that spanned nearly six decades. She was an A-grade singer who graduated from Sri Lanka Broadcasting Corporation.

She died at the age of 79 while receiving treatment at National Hospital of Sri Lanka, Colombo.

Personal life
Angeline Gunathilaka was born on 23 December 1939 in Matara district, the seventh of ten siblings. She went to St. Mary's Convent Matara for primary education. Her father worked at the Department of Railways. Due to her father's employers transferring him, the family moved to Colombo at the age of 8. She then attended St. Thomas' College, Kotte for secondary education.

She married Leslie Gunathilaka on 29 March 1966. The couple has 2 daughters. Her grandson, Imal Jude Malwattege, pursued a career in music.

On 29 March 2019, Gunathilaka died while receiving treatment at the National Hospital, Colombo. Her final rites were held at the General Cemetery Borella on Tuesday, April 2 at 4 p.m.

Singing career
At the age of 8, Angeline joined the Radio Ceylon amateur program, and secured the second place in a musical talent show. After that, she studied music under maestro Sunil Santha. At the age of 13, she was selected for the Lamapitiya programme conducted by veteran lyricist and broadcaster Karunaratne Abeysekera.

Angeline started her singing career with the solo song Adara Ambare. While she performed on the Lamapitiya program, she attended a singing competition called Tharu Thenuma organized by Sri Murugan New Art Films. She won the competition and was selected for first playback singing. Her debut as a playback singer came with the film Sohoyuro screened in 1958. In the same year, she sang the first duet of her career with Sydney  Artigla. She then collaborated with Morris Dahanayake, R. Sivananda and V. Vardaraja for duets. Aside from singing, she studied dance under the maestro Panibharatha.

She rose to prominence within a small period of time, where she met P. L. A. Somapala. He invited Gunathilaka to record songs under HMV label. She recorded songs with Chitral Somapala and Mohideen Baig for the 2500th Buddha Jayanthi commemoration. Along with Buddhist songs, she worked on many Christmas songs, which she sang together with C.T. Fernando under the influence of Marcelline Jayakody. She continued to gain popularity in the Sri Lankan music industry, where she started to play duets with Wally Bastian. She also sang virindu songs for the film Deyyange Rate. 

From 1958 to 1999, Gunathilaka performed as a singer on behalf of many actresses including Leena De Silva, Florida Jayalath, Sandya Kumari, Claris De Silva,  Jeevarani Kurukulasuriya, Malani Fonseka, Geetha Kumarasinghe, Soniya Dissanayaka, Shriyani Amarasena,  Kanthi Lanka, Sumana Amarasinghe, Fareena Layee, Shrima Koddikara, Sabeetha Perera, Manel Wanaguru, Shriyani Fonseka, Shirani Kurykulasuriya, Anoja Weerasinghe, Swarna Mallawarachchi , Sangeetha Weeraratne, Suvinitha Koongahage, Dilhani Ekanayake, Manel Chandralatha and many more. Gunathilaka gained widespread popularity for a duet with H.R. Jothipala. The two contributed to a vast number of films across many genres. On 9 August 2009, she performed a musical show Angeline Rocks with The Boys at 6.30 pm at the BMICH.

On 23 August 2014, she performed a live concert at Bandaranaike Memorial International Conference Hall.

Playback singing filmography
Angeline Gunathilaka worked on over 200 Sinhala films across six decades.

References

External links
Latha speaks about her friend
Funeral of Angeline Gunathilake
Funeral photos
එකට ප්‍රසංගයක් කරමු කියලා ඇන්ජලීන් කිව්වා - ලතා වල්පොල
ඇන්ජලින් දෙව්මව් තුරුළට ගියාය

1939 births
2019 deaths
People from Matara, Sri Lanka
20th-century Sri Lankan women singers
Sri Lankan Roman Catholics
Sinhalese singers